William Grant Bangerter (June 8, 1918 – April 18, 2010) was a general authority of the Church of Jesus Christ of Latter-day Saints (LDS Church) from 1975 until his death.

Bangerter was born in Granger, Utah. From 1939 to 1941, he served as a Mormon missionary in Brazil. After his mission he graduated from the University of Utah and became a building contractor.

In the LDS Church, Bangerter served as a bishop in Granger and was later president of the church's North Jordan Stake. From 1958 to 1963, Bangerter was president of the church's Brazilian Mission. After serving in Brazil, he became a regional representative. In 1974, he became the first president of the church's Portugal Lisbon Mission. In 1975, he became an Assistant to the Quorum of the Twelve Apostles. In 1976, when the position of Assistant to the Twelve was abolished, Bangerter became a member of the First Quorum of the Seventy. He twice served as a member of the Presidency of the Seventy, from 1978 to 1980 and from 1985 to 1989. In 1989, he was designated as an emeritus general authority and released from active duties.

From 1990 to 1993, Bangerter was president of the Jordan River Utah Temple. He later worked in the Mount Timpanogos Utah Temple and from 2003 until his death was a patriarch in the Alpine Utah West Stake.

Family
Bangerter is the father of 11 children. In 1944, he married Mildred Lee Schwantes, with whom he had four children. Mildred died of leukemia in 1952. In 1953, Bangerter married Geraldine Hamblin and they became the parents of seven children.

Bangerter is the elder brother of Norman H. Bangerter, who was governor of Utah from 1985 to 1993. He is the father of Julie B. Beck, who served as the general president of the church's Relief Society from 2007 to 2012.

References
"Elder William Grant Bangerter: Assistant to the Council of the Twelve", Ensign, May 1975
"Elder W. Grant Bangerter of the Presidency of the First Quorum of the Seventy," Ensign, November 1978, pp. 96–97
Lynn Arave, "Elder William Grant Bangerter dies at 91", Deseret News, 2010-04-19

External links

1918 births
2010 deaths
20th-century Mormon missionaries
Assistants to the Quorum of the Twelve Apostles
Members of the First Quorum of the Seventy (LDS Church)
Mission presidents (LDS Church)
American Mormon missionaries in Brazil
American Mormon missionaries in Portugal
Patriarchs (LDS Church)
People from Alpine, Utah
People from West Valley City, Utah
Presidents of the Seventy (LDS Church)
Temple presidents and matrons (LDS Church)
University of Utah alumni
American general authorities (LDS Church)